The narrow-bridged musk turtle (Claudius angustatus) is a species of turtle in the family Kinosternidae. The species is found in Central America and Mexico.

Geographic range
C. angustatus is found in Mexico, Guatemala, and Belize.

Taxonomy
As of 2010, C. angustatus is the only recognized extant species in the genus Claudius.

Description
The narrow-bridged musk turtle is typically brown in color. The scutes of the carapace have lines and graining, imparting an almost wood-like appearance. It often has bright-yellow markings on the edges of the carapace. As it ages, algae often heavily cover the shell, masking the patterning and coloration. The head is large and bulbous for its size, with a sharp beak and a long neck. The jaw joint anatomy of the narrow-bridged musk turtle is unique among modern Cryptodira. In most cryptodires the jaw joint is formed by a biconcave facet. In the narrow-bridged musk turtle, the jaw joint of is formed by a broad hemispherical condyle, more akin to Pleurodira.
The carapace is domed, with three distinct ridges down the length. Though classified in the subfamily Staurotypinae with the "giant" musk turtles, the narrow-bridged musk turtle generally only grows to a straight carapace length of about 6.5 in (16.5 cm).

The narrow-bridged musk turtle exhibits genetic sex determination, in contrast to most turtles; although the mechanism is not known for certain, it is suspected to be XX/XY like that of its relative Staurotypus.

Behavior, habitat, and diet
Like all musk turtles, the narrow-bridged musk turtle is almost entirely aquatic, and prefers habitats such as slow-moving creeks, or shallow ponds that are heavily vegetated. It spends much of its time walking along the bottom, foraging for aquatic  insects and other invertebrates, and carrion. It has glands under the rear of the shell from which it can release a foul-smelling musk, hence its common name.

References

External links
Turtles of the World: Claudius angustatus

Further reading
Boulenger GA (1889). Catalogue of the Chelonians, Rhynchocephalians, and Crocodiles in the British Museum (Natural History). New Edition. London: Trustees of the British Museum (Natural History). (Taylor and Francis, printers). x + 311 pp. + Plates I-III. (Genus Claudius, p. 32; species C. angustatus, p. 33).
Cope ED (1865). "Third contribution to the HERPETOLOGY of Tropical America". Proc. Acad. Nat. Sci. Philadelphia 17: 185–198. (Claudius angustatus, new species, pp. 187–188).
Goin CJ, Goin OB, Zug GR (1978). Introduction to Herpetology, Third Edition. San Francisco: W.H. Freeman and Company. xi + 378 pp. . (Genus Claudius, p. 264).

Staurotypinae
Turtles of North America
Reptiles of Mexico
Reptiles of Belize
Reptiles of Guatemala
Near threatened fauna of North America
Reptiles described in 1865
Taxa named by Edward Drinker Cope